J. N. B. Crim House is a historic home located at Elk City, Barbour County, West Virginia. It was built in 1874–1875, and is a two-story, "L"-shaped, Italianate style brick house. It features an entrance portico with a flat roof supported by eight wrought iron columns. Joseph Napoleon Bonaparte Crim (1835–1905), for whom it was built, was a prominent local merchant and banker.

The house was listed on the National Register of Historic Places in 1984.

See also
 National Register of Historic Places listings in Barbour County, West Virginia
 Peck-Crim-Chesser House

References

Houses completed in 1875
Houses in Barbour County, West Virginia
Houses on the National Register of Historic Places in West Virginia
Italianate architecture in West Virginia
National Register of Historic Places in Barbour County, West Virginia